Group 7 of the UEFA Women's Euro 2017 qualifying competition consisted of five teams: England, Belgium, Serbia, Bosnia and Herzegovina, and Estonia. The composition of the eight groups in the qualifying group stage was decided by the draw held on 20 April 2015.

The group was played in home-and-away round-robin format. The group winners qualified directly for the final tournament, while the runners-up also qualified directly if they were one of the six best runners-up among all eight groups (not counting results against the fifth-placed team); otherwise, the runners-up advance to the play-offs.

Standings

Matches
Times are CEST (UTC+2) for dates between 29 March and 24 October 2015 and between 27 March and 29 October 2016, for other dates times are CET (UTC+1).

Goalscorers
6 goals

 Milena Nikolić
 Karen Carney
 Danielle Carter

5 goals

 Jill Scott

4 goals

 Janice Cayman
 Tessa Wullaert

3 goals

 Tine De Caigny
 Aline Zeler
 Nikita Parris
 Jelena Čubrilo
 Mirela Tenkov

2 goals

 Julie Biesmans
 Maud Coutereels
 Elke Van Gorp
 Izzy Christiansen
 Gemma Davison
 Fran Kirby
 Ellen White

1 goal

 Cécile De Gernier
 Laura Deloose
 Audrey Demoustier
 Tine Schryvers
 Sara Yuceil
 Merjema Medić
 Antonela Radeljić
 Rachel Daly
 Alex Greenwood
 Jo Potter
 Jovana Damnjanović
 Milica Mijatović
 Marija Radojičić
 Violeta Slović

1 own goal

 Nikolina Dijaković (playing against Belgium)
 Inna Zlidnis (playing against Belgium)
 Nevena Damjanović (playing against England)

References

External links
Standings, UEFA.com

Group 7